Crystal Lake may refer to the following lakes in Michigan:

Crystal Lake (Benzie County, Michigan), largest

Alcona County in Haynes Township near the village of Lincoln at 
Calhoun County in Fredonia Township near Marshall at 
Dickinson County in Iron Mountain at 
Rural Dickinson County at 
Gogebic County on the border with Wisconsin just east of US 45 at 
Hillsdale County  in Somerset Township just north of Somerset Center at 
Houghton County in the Ottawa National Forest a few miles west of Sidnaw on M-28 at 
Manistee County in Wellston, Manistee County, Michigan from M-55 Hwy, take Seaman Road south less than 1 mile, lake on west side of Seaman Road (no motor boats are allowed).
Montcalm County  in Crystal Township about 15 mile (24 km) southwest of Alma at 
Montmorency County in Albert Township a few miles northwest of Lewiston at 
Newaygo County  in Sherman Township midway between Fremont and White Cloud at 
Oakland County near Pontiac at 
Oakland County in Holly Township in the Holly State Recreation Area at 
Oceana County in Hart Township midway between Shelby and Hart, Michigan just east of U.S. Highway 31 at

See also
List of lakes in Michigan

Lists of coordinates
Lakes of Michigan